La Baussaine (Gallo: La Bauczaènn) is a commune in the Ille-et-Vilaine department in Brittany in northwestern France.

Population

Inhabitants of La Baussaine are called Baussainais in French.

Sights

The church of Saint Léon was built in the 15th century of Bécherel granite. It was classified as a historic monument in 1926. Although they are damaged, the stained-glass windows are an excellent example of 16th-century art. Two of the panels can be attributed to Guyon Collin.

See also
Communes of the Ille-et-Vilaine department

References

External links

Official site
 Cultural Heritage 

Mayors of Ille-et-Vilaine Association 

Communes of Ille-et-Vilaine